Tandem is an Armenian sitcom television series developed by Arman Nshanyan. The series premiered on Armenia 1 on 5 March 2018. The shooting of the sitcom started on 23 December 2017.
The series takes place in Yerevan, Armenia.

References

 Tandem at the Internet Movie Database

Public Television Company of Armenia original programming
2010s Armenian television series
Armenian-language television shows
Armenian comedy television series
2018 Armenian television series debuts